The 2011 Green Bay Cash Spiel was a bonspiel, or curling tournament, that took place at the Green Bay Curling Club in Green Bay, Wisconsin. The tournament was held as a triple-knockout format. The tournament was established in 2011 as a part of the World Curling Tour, the Ontario Curling Tour, and the Great Lakes Curling Tour.

Teams

Knockout results

A event

B event

C event

Playoffs

References

External links

Curling in Wisconsin
Curling competitions in the United States
Green Bay Cash Spiel
Green Bay Cash Spiel